Elie Ngoyi (born September 25, 1988) is a Canadian football defensive end. He was drafted by the Edmonton Eskimos in the sixth round of the 2013 CFL Draft. He played CIS football at Bishop's University.

Early years
Ngoyi was born in the Brazzaville, Congo, Africa and moved to Canada at the age of ten. He first played football in grade 9.

Professional career
Ngoyi was drafted by the Edmonton Eskimos of the CFL with the 51st pick in the 2013 CFL Draft.  After playing 53 games with the Eskimos over four seasons, he was released after training camp on June 17, 2017.

References

External links
Just Sports Stats
Elie Ngoyi official website
Edmonton Eskimos bio 

Living people
1988 births
Canadian football defensive linemen
Bishop's Gaiters football players
Edmonton Elks players
Sportspeople from Brazzaville
Montreal Alouettes players